Chanel Cresswell  (born 23 January 1990) is an English actress, known for playing Kelly Jenkins in the film This Is England (2006) and the three subsequent series This Is England '86 (2010), This Is England '88 (2011) and This Is England '90 (2015). She has also appeared as Katie McVey in the Sky One sitcom Trollied from 2011 to 2013 and 2015 to 2018.

Early and personal life
Cresswell grew up in Codnor, Derbyshire and attended Aldercar Community Language College.

Career
Cresswell's first role came in 2006 playing Kelly Jenkins in the film This Is England when she was sixteen years old. She subsequently appeared as Kelly again in the next three miniseries that followed in September 2010, December 2011 and September until October 2015 which aired on Channel 4. She won a BAFTA for Best Supporting Actress for her role in the This is England series at the 2016 British Academy Television Awards.

She has also appeared in Casualty, Butterfly, Bale and Wish 143 before playing Hailey in the TV movie Dive. From 2011 to 2013 Cresswell starred in Sky One sitcom Trollied as Katie McVey, returning to the show in 2015 and continued in this until the final episode in December 2018. She appeared in a main role as Jess Meredith in ITV drama series, The Bay in March 2019.

Filmography

Film

Television

References

External links
 

Living people
1990 births
People from Codnor
English film actresses
English television actresses
Best Supporting Actress BAFTA Award (television) winners
21st-century English actresses